Fruits Clipper (stylized FRUITS CLiPPER) is the seventh album by the Japanese electronica band Capsule. It was released in May 2006.

A remastered version was released in August 2021, titled "FRUITS CLiPPER (2021 Remaster)".

Track list

Initial copies were sold with a 12 cm vinyl record with the track "School of Electro".

References

Links
 

Capsule (band) albums
Albums produced by Yasutaka Nakata
2006 albums